Jerzy Piskun (4 June 1938 – 16 July 2018) was a Polish basketball player. He competed in the men's tournament at the 1960 Summer Olympics and the 1964 Summer Olympics.

Honours
Polonia Warsaw
 Polish basketball championship (1): 1958–59
Poland
 EuroBasket runner-up: 1963
 EuroBasket third place: 1965

References

External links
 

1938 births
2018 deaths
Polish men's basketball players
Olympic basketball players of Poland
Basketball players at the 1960 Summer Olympics
Basketball players at the 1964 Summer Olympics
Sportspeople from Pinsk